WTSD-CD, virtual channel 14 (UHF digital channel 23), was a low-powered, Class A independent television station licensed to Philadelphia, Pennsylvania, United States. The station was owned by Local Media TV Philadelphia, LLC.

WTSD-CD left the air in 2017 as a result of the incentive auction, in which it was paid more than $62 million to leave the air.

History

In Delaware
On November 28, 1980, the Federal Communications Commission approved an application by Francis J. Tafelski for a construction permit for a new TV translator station on channel 61 (W61AN) to serve Newark and Brookside, Delaware, rebroadcasting WGCB-TV (channel 49) of Red Lion, Pennsylvania, with an effective radiated power of 100 watts. The station applied for a license to cover on July 8, 1981.

When a full-power station, WTGI, signed on channel 61 in 1985, it forced W61AN to move. In 1988, the FCC granted the station a move to channel 14, increasing power to 1 kilowatt and assigning it the new call sign of W14BG. Tafelski sold the translator to Priority Communications Ministries, Inc., in 1991. On August 21, 1995, the W14BG call sign was changed to WXHL-LP, complementing Priority's Christian radio station WXHL-FM; by this time, channel 14 was airing local Christian programming. It soon changed to a format of contemporary Christian music videos.

WXHL-LP was approved in 1996 to increase its effective radiated power to 71 kilowatts; the community of license was changed to Wilmington, with new facilities approved in Christiana. In 2000, WXHL-LP was approved for Class A status.

Move to Philadelphia and back

On March 12, 2002, WXHL-LP was granted a construction permit to make a major move to the Roxborough, Philadelphia antenna farm, used for television in Philadelphia. At the same time, the call letters were changed to WTSD-CA. In 2006, the station suffered through a blown transmitter tube and then was forced to go silent when it lost its leased transmitter site.
Priority Communications continued to own WTSD-CA, but it fell into bankruptcy in 2007.

The station reemerged from silence in June 2007, having moved back from Roxborough to the Christiana site from which it previously broadcast under special temporary authority; this would be extended nine times from 2007 to 2011.

In September 2011, the sale of WTSD-CA to Loop Media, LLC, for $300,000, was announced. On December 29, 2011, WTSD-CA ceased analog transmission from its temporary site in Wilmington. Three months later, Loop sold WTSD-CA to Local Media TV Philadelphia, LLC, a subsidiary of Local Media TV Holdings LLC of Alexandria, Virginia.

On June 24, 2012, WTSD-CA returned, this time in digital. It had moved from channel 14 to 16, so as to avoid any 52 dBu contour overlap within 130 km radius of New York City, where channel 14 is allocated to land mobile services. However, channel 16 in New York City is allocated to its public safety communications system, which immediately began experiencing interference when the WTSD-CA digital facility was activated. At the request of the city of New York, WTSD-CD ceased operating to allow New York officials to investigate on July 3. In the meantime, WTSD-CA was allowed to reduce its power to 22 watts.

In the wake of Superstorm Sandy, the New York City government concluded that it would not have the resources to do the testing necessary to investigate keeping WTSD-CA on channel 16. As a result, with the blessing of the city, WTSD-CA filed to move to channel 23, where it resumed operations on June 11, 2013, and was licensed as WTSD-CD three days later.

In the incentive auction to free up space for wireless services, and in which Class A stations were eligible to participate, WTSD-CD received $62,788,846 to leave the air permanently.

Digital channels
The station's digital signal was multiplexed:

References

External links

TSD-CD
1981 establishments in Pennsylvania
2017 disestablishments in Pennsylvania
Defunct television stations in the United States
Television channels and stations disestablished in 2017
Television channels and stations established in 1981
TSD-CD